Ecphyas is a monotypic moth genus in the family Geometridae. Its only species, Ecphyas holopsara, is found in Australia. Both the genus and species were first described by Turner in 1929.

References

Oenochrominae
Monotypic moth genera